The Martin Horst House is a historic residence in Mobile, Alabama, United States.  It was built in 1867 in the Italianate Style.  The building was placed on the National Register of Historic Places on June 21, 1971.

References

Houses completed in 1867
Houses in Mobile, Alabama
Houses on the National Register of Historic Places in Alabama
Italianate architecture in Alabama
National Register of Historic Places in Mobile, Alabama